Keijo Olavi Kajantie (born 1940) is a Finnish theoretical physicist and Professor and Adjoint Scientist at the Helsinki Institute of Physics. He was Professor of Physics at the University of Helsinki from 1973 to 2008. From 1985 to 1990 he was a Research Professor of the Academy of Finland and he has worked in the CERN Theory Division. He is best known for his contributions to the study of the electroweak and strong interactions at high temperatures, as well as to the field of ultrarelativistic nuclear collisions. His research interests include ultrarelativistic nuclear collisions, finite temperature field theory, string theory and QCD matter, cosmological phase transitions and null infinity in general relativity.

Honours and awards
Kajantie was awarded the Finnish Academy of Science Award in 2008 and the Order of the Lion of Finland in 2012.

References

Particle physicists
Theoretical physicists
Recipients of the Order of the Lion of Finland
1940 births
Academic staff of the University of Helsinki
Living people
People associated with CERN
21st-century Finnish physicists
20th-century Finnish physicists